Sudan Yellow 3G, also known as Solvent Yellow 16, C.I. disperse yellow and C.I. 12700, is a yellow azo dye. It is soluble in fats and oils.

Sudan Yellow 3G is used as a pigment in cosmetics and printer toners, and as a dye in inks, including inks for inkjet printers. In pyrotechnics, it is used in some yellow colored smokes.

References

Azo dyes
Sudan dyes
Pyrazolones